Pseudanabasis is a genus of snout moth. It was described by Y.L. Du, S.M. Song and C.S. Wu in 2009. The genus contains only one species, Pseudanabasis incanimaculata, which is found in China (Xizang).

References

Phycitinae
Monotypic moth genera
Moths of Asia
Pyralidae genera